aXXo is the Internet alias of an individual who released and standardized commercial film DVDs as free downloads on the Internet between 2005 and 2009. The files, which were usually new films, were popular among the file sharing community using peer-to-peer file sharing protocols such as BitTorrent. A download-tracking firm BigChampagne found — in a sampling period in late 2008 — that almost 33.5% of all movie downloads were aXXo torrents. aXXo encoded files to approximately 700 MB – the same size for a compact disc. Due to the re-encoded quality of an aXXo file, the suffix "aXXo" was often used by imitators.

History
aXXo first appeared in November 2005 on the message board "Darkside_RG".

In November 2007, aXXo deleted all of their files released after September 7, 2006 from The Pirate Bay protesting that the site was allowing harassing comments to be added to their torrents by "possible members of MPAA". While past aXXo torrents remained available on other torrent sites, uploads of new aXXo files stopped on November 11, 2007. After an absence of four months aXXo returned to uploading, starting with the movie I Am Legend on March 9, 2008.

On December 15, 2008, aXXo's thousandth movie upload, a copy of the Kiefer Sutherland horror film Mirrors, appeared on an Internet forum for the Darkside Release Group.

On March 11, 2009, aXXo stopped uploading new files after releasing Punisher: War Zone.  For a while they logged into Mininova until the site switched to only hosting torrents that were Content Distribution free or torrents with no copyrights.

On April 19, 2009 aXXo made their last known comment on message board "Darkside_RG", in response to rumors that they had stopped posting on Darkside_RG. They stated:

Format information
aXXo converted commercial DVD movies into approximately 700 MB .avi files which were then used to create a .torrent file that were uploaded to Bittorrent Trackers allowing the movie to be downloaded. On file sharing websites, aXXo files attracted large followings with more than a million users downloading aXXo files each month. Files released by aXXo followed the naming convention "Name.Of.Movie[year]DvDrip[Eng]-aXXo.avi", where "DvDrip[Eng]" implied it was ripped from an English-language disc and "avi" referred to the resulting file format. The video was encoded according to the MPEG-4 ASP standard, compatible with the Xvid codec. The aXXo postings also carried a .nfo file about the movie and an attached text file that states, in part: "Be aware of bogus sites and lamers, download your aXXo files from aXXo accounts. Enjoy!"

Identity
In a purported interview of a person claiming to be aXXo, they described themselves as a single individual who has been ripping DVDs since they were a teenager.

Imitators
Due to its popularity in the file sharing subculture, the pseudonym aXXo is falsely assumed by a variety of individuals and groups to mimic the source identity as a disguise for their own uploads on file sharing websites. A portion of such decoys is made available by a range of companies in the field of copyright enforcement, such as BayTSP, MediaDefender, or MediaSentry, with the aim of suing to make a profit. These faked files, or groups of files, would normally contain useless or potentially malicious data. The type of maliciously fake files include RAR format files that require the users to download a trojan disguised as a codec needed to view associated AVI format files. Other fake files encourage the users to register on dubious websites or require the users install the DomPlayer software. Fake files may also contain malware with the capability to send the IP address of the user's computer to a private server.
For years aXXo has been warning followers to “beware of bogus sites and lamers” in the .nfo files which accompany their torrents.

About a year after aXXo signed off in 2009, another user YIFY began uploading torrents and eventually launched its own website known as YTS.

See also

 Warez
YIFY

References

External links
aXXo related articles at TorrentFreak

BitTorrent
File sharing
Internet in the United States
The Pirate Bay
Unidentified people